Kandra is a census town in the Adityapur CD block in the Seraikela Sadar subdivision of the Saraikela Kharsawan district in the Indian state of Jharkhand.

Geography

Location
It has an average elevation of 226 metres (741 feet).

Area overview 
The area shown in the map has been described as “part of the southern fringe of the Chotanagpur plateau and is a hilly upland tract”. 75.7% of the population lives in the rural areas and 24.3% lives in the urban areas.

Note: The map alongside presents some of the notable locations in the district. All places marked in the map are linked in the larger full screen map.

Civic administration  
There is a police station at Kandra.

Demographics
According to the 2011 Census of India, Kandra had a total population of 8,137, of which 4,239 (53%) were males and 3,918 (48%) were females. Population in the age range 0–6 years was 1,215. The total number of literate persons in Kandra was 5,307 (76.45% of the population over 6 years).

(*For language details see Adityapur block#Language and religion)

 India census, Kandra had a population of 6,815. Males constitute 53% of the population and females 47%. Kandra has an average literacy rate of 61%, higher than the national average of 59.5%: male literacy is 72%, and female literacy is 49%. In Kandra, 13% of the population is under 6 years of age.

Infrastructure 
Among the civic amenities, it had  of roads with open drains. The protected water supply involved hand pump, uncovered well. It had 1,551 domestic electric connections, 10 road lighting points. Among the medical facilities, it had 1 hospital, 1 dispensary, 1 health centre, 9 family welfare centres, 9 maternity and child welfare centres, 22 maternity homes, 2 nursing homes, 1 veterinary hospital, 2 medicine shops. It had 4 non-formal education centres (Sarva Shiksha Abhiyan). Among social, cultural and recreational facilities, it had 1 auditorium/ community hall. Three important commodities it produced were sponge iron, bamboo items, metal. It had the branch offices of 1 nationalised bank, 1 private commercial bank, 1 co-operative bank, 5 agricultural credit societies, 2 non-agricultural credit societies.

Economy 

 Seraikella Glass Works (P) Ltd. (Closed in 1990s)
 Adhunik Group.
 Nilachal Iron and Power Ltd.

Transport

Roadways 
Kandra is well connected with all major cities of Jharkhand and other parts of India through national and state highways. The major highways are:
 6 lane Expressway (Adityapur-Kandra Road) connects Jamshedpur to Kandra 
 National Highway 18 passes near Kandra and connects Jamshedpur to Govindpur via Dhanbad, Purulia, Chandil,
 State Highway 5 passes through Kandra and connects to Chaibasa and Seraikela.

Railways 
Kandra Railway Station is a railway junction on the Chakradharpur division, of the South Eastern Railway.
Kandra station has about 4 platforms and 2 thorough tracks for non stopping trains. Few of the long distance trains heading to Tatanagar Railway Station stop at platform 3 and 2.

Airport 
Tata Steel had proposed to set up a  Greenfield airport on the outskirts of Jamshedpur in Kandra, Adityapur-Seraikela region. In June 2011 Tata Steel and TRIL entered formally into a joint venture for building the airport. The new airport will be of international standard with a 10,000 ft runway, it will have the capacity to allow commercial airliners such as the Airbus A320 to land and take off which was not possible from the present airport. As of December 2012, Land acquisition process has started for the Airport. The company is at present facing opposition in the acquisition process from the local villagers.

Education 

Harish Chandra Vidhya Mandir, Kandra

Culture
Kandra is famous for Manasa Puja, dedicated to the Goddess of snakes.
Durga Puja followed by Dashehra Ravan Dhahan is one of the largest fair held by the local people.
Jagganath Rath Yatra,
Chat Parv,
Tusu Mela,
Hari Sankritan,
Bhagta Parv, Kandra has a very beautiful cultural heritage.

References

http://timesofindia.indiatimes.com/city/jamshedpur/Locals-oppose-Tata-plan-for-new-airport/articleshow/52218359.cms

Neighbourhoods in Jamshedpur